Albert George Percy "Staunch" Owens (20 August 1900 – 7 October 1986) was an Australian rules footballer who played for East Perth in the West Australian Football League (WAFL). He was a seven-time WAFL premiership player with East Perth and was on the losing side of a grand final three times. After turning to umpiring he was involved in a further five grand finals, a total of 15 as a player and umpire.

Playing career
Born in Kalgoorlie, Western Australia, Owens moved to Perth as a child, and played in a combined Perth schools team that toured the Goldfields in 1911.

He made his debut for the East Perth team in the Ex-Scholars' league at the age of 14, and two years later made his debut for East Perth's senior team in the WAFL.

Owens was with East Perth during a golden period for the club and played in seven premiership team, including five in a row from 1919 to 1923. He was generally a ruckman but could often play as a centre half-forward. In 1925 he won the Sandover Medal, receiving four votes.

Owens finished his career with 195 WAFL games for East Perth.

He was also a regular Western Australian interstate representative and appeared for his state in both the 1924 Hobart and 1927 Melbourne carnivals. In all he represented his state on 17 occasions.

Umpiring career
Following his retirement he became an umpire, beginning in 1934 in the Public Schools Association (PSA). After umpiring PSA finals in his first year, he became a WANFL umpire the following year. He officiated in the league grand final in his first year as a WANFL umpire. He later controlled the 1937, 1938, 1939 and 1941 grand finals. In all he officiated in 135 league games between 1935 and 1941.

Honours
In 2004 inducted into the Western Australian Hall of Champions and the West Australian Football Hall of Fame.

See also
 1927 Melbourne Carnival

Footnotes

External links

1900 births
1986 deaths
Australian rules footballers from Perth, Western Australia
West Australian Football League umpires
East Perth Football Club players
Sandover Medal winners
West Australian Football Hall of Fame inductees
People from Kalgoorlie